Gérard Ernest Schneider (1896–1986) was a Swiss painter.

A major pioneer of Lyrical Abstraction, a gestural and personal form of abstraction, along with Hans Hartung and Pierre Soulages, Gérard Schneider was shown in Paris at the Galerie Louis Carré as early as 1950.

From 1955 to 1960, Schneider's work was exhibited at the Kootz Gallery in New York where an exclusivity contract connected the artist and the American dealer Samuel Kootz.

From gesture, “the shape is born, whether lyrical or dramatic, with its colour and technical means, without any reference to external nature” according to Schneider.

Eugène Ionesco spoke of “the original, eruptive, richness” of his work.

From nervous gesture and volcanic composition, full of tension, of the 1950s followed “the light years” from Michel Ragon's expression, which were marked by the balance of forms reflecting each other and the explosion of colour. "Painting should be looked in the same way as music is listened to", as Schneider enjoyed saying.

Musical, his work is to be understood like “an orchestra” which expresses “passion, fury, romanticism“ according to Michel Ragon.

Collections 

The works of Schneider are in museums including the Centre Pompidou in Paris, MoMa in New York, the Phillips Collection in Washington, the Museum of Fine Arts of Montréal and the Modern Art Museum of Rio de Janeiro, as well as private collections and foundations such as the Fondation Gandur pour l’Art in Geneva.

Catalogue raisonné 

The Galerie Diane de Polignac in Paris is preparing the Catalogue raisonné of the works on canvas by Gérard Schneider edited by Laurence Schneider, the artist's daughter, and Patrick Gilles Persin, an art historian.

Major exhibitions 

 L'Envolée lyrique, Paris 1945-1956, Musée du Luxembourg, Paris, 26/04/2006-6/08/2006
 Gérard Schneider, grands gestes pour un grand monde, Musée d’Art & d’Histoire, Neuchâtel, 15/05/2011-16/10/2011
 Les Sujets de l’abstraction, Peinture non-figurative de la Seconde École de Paris (1946-1962), Fondation Gandur pour l’Art, Musée Rath, Genève, 06/05/2011-14/08/2011
 Gérard Schneider. Rétrospective, Musée des Beaux-Arts d’Orléans, 24/02/13-2/06/13

Links 
 Official website

Notes and references 

This article was initially translated from the German Wikipedia.

20th-century Swiss painters
Swiss male painters
1896 births
1986 deaths
Abstract painters
20th-century Swiss male artists